Military Comfort Women may refer to:

 Military Comfort Women (book), a book by Kakou Senda
 Military Comfort Women (film), a 1974 film based on the book

See also
 Comfort women, women and girls forced into sexual slavery by the Imperial Japanese Army